This article is about the particular significance of the decade 1750 - 1759 to Wales and its people.

Incumbents
Prince of Wales
Frederick (to 31 March 1751)
George (from 20 April 1751) (later George III)
Princess of Wales - Augusta (to 31 March 1751) (afterwards Dowager Princess of Wales)

Events
1750 in Wales
1751 in Wales
1752 in Wales
1753 in Wales
1754 in Wales
1755 in Wales
1756 in Wales
1757 in Wales
1758 in Wales
1759 in Wales

Arts and literature

New books
1750
Griffith Hughes - Natural History of Barbados
Daniel Rowland - Ymddiddan rhwng Methodist Uniawngred ac un Cyfeiliornus
1752
Theophilus Evans - A History of Modern Enthusiasm
1757
John Dyer - The Fleece
Elizabeth Griffith - A Series of Genuine Letters between Henry and Frances
Joseph Harris - An Essay Upon Money and Coins
Joshua Thomas - Tystiolaeth y Credadyn

Music
1751
William Williams (Pantycelyn) - Hosanna i Fab Dafydd, part 1
1754
William Williams (Pantycelyn) - Hosanna i Fab Dafydd, part 2
1755
Morgan Rhys - Golwg o Ben Nebo, ar Wlad yr Addewid (hymns)
1756
Elis Roberts - "Argulus"
1757
Elis Roberts - "Jeils"
1759
William Williams (Pantycelyn) - Rhai Hymnau a Chaniadau Duwiol

Births
1750
June - William Morgan, actuary (d. 1833)
1751
22 January - David Richards (Dafydd Ionawr), poet (d. 1827)
15 October - David Samwell, naval surgeon and companion of Captain Cook (d. 1798)
1752
2 January - Nicholas Owen, priest and antiquary (d. 1811)
18 January - Josiah Boydell, painter (d. 1817)
March - Edward Jones (Bardd y Brenin), harpist (d. 1824)
date unknown
Richard Llwyd, poet and writer (d. 1835) 
Thomas Assheton Smith I, industrialist (d. 1828)
1754
date unknown - Charles Hassall, surveyor (d. 1814)
1755
22 February - Henry Nevill, 2nd Earl of Abergavenny (d. 1843)
5 July - Sarah Siddons, actress (d. 1831)
14 October - Thomas Charles of Bala, priest (d. 1814)
1756
7 June - Edward Davies ("Celtic" Davies), writer (d. 1831)
23 June - Thomas Jones, mathematician (d. 1807)
date unknown - Thomas Jones of Denbigh, minister and author (d. 1820)
1757
date unknown - Sir Thomas Foley, admiral (d. 1833)
1758
August - Sir Thomas Picton, soldier (d. 1815)
1759
16 March - Sir John Nicholl, politician and judge (d. 1838)
7 August - William Owen Pughe, lexicographer (d. 1835)
18 October - Theophilus Jones, historian (d. 1812)

Deaths
1750
9 January - Henry Herbert, 9th Earl of Pembroke, 56
29 November - Bussy Mansel, 4th Baron Mansel
date unknown - Sir Samuel Pennant, Lord Mayor of London
1751
31 March - Frederick, Prince of Wales, 44
date unknown - Thomas Mathews, admiral, 75
1752
31 May - "Madam" Sidney Griffith, Methodist supporter
1754
10 January - Erasmus Lewis, writer and civil servant, 83
March - Henry Vaughan, Radnorshire landowner, 33 (murdered)
12 July - Zachariah Williams, inventor, 81
1755
30 June - Edward Wynne, lawyer and landowner
1756
date unknown - Lewis Evans, surveyor, 56?
1757
December - John Dyer, poet, 56
1758
24 January - William Wogan, religious writer, 79
18 March - Matthew Hutton, Archbishop of Canterbury and former Bishop of Bangor, 65
24 March - Sir Thomas Mostyn, 4th Baronet, 53
1759
11 August - John Heylyn, Welsh-descended priest, 74
2 November - Charles Hanbury Williams, diplomat and satirist, 50
date unknown - Isaac Maddox, Bishop of St Asaph, 62

 
18th century in Wales
Wales
Wales
Decades in Wales